Fanconi anemia group D2 protein is a protein that in humans is encoded by the FANCD2 gene. The Fanconi anemia complementation group (FANC) currently includes FANCA, FANCB, FANCC, FANCD1 (also called BRCA2), FANCD2 (this gene), FANCE, FANCF, FANCG, FANCI , FANCJ, FANCL, FANCM, FANCN and FANCO.

Function 

Fanconi anemia is a disorder with a recessive Mendelian pattern of inheritance characterized by chromosomal instability, hypersensitivity to DNA crosslinking agents, increased chromosomal breakage, and defective DNA repair.  The members of the Fanconi anemia complementation group do not share sequence similarity; they are related by their assembly into a common nuclear protein complex. This gene encodes the protein for complementation group D2. This protein is monoubiquitinated in response to DNA damage, resulting in its localization to nuclear foci with other proteins (BRCA1 and BRCA2) involved in homology-directed DNA repair (see Figure: Recombinational repair of DNA double-strand damages).  A nuclear complex containing FANCA, [Fanconi anemia, complementation group A], FANCB, FANCC, FANCE, FANCF, FANCL and FANCG proteins is required for the activation of the FANCD2 protein to the mono-ubiquitinated isoform.

Mono-ubiquination of FANCD2 is essential for repairing DNA interstrand crosslinks, and clamps the protein on DNA together with its partner protein FANCI. The monoubiquitinated FANCD2:FANCI complex coats DNA in a filament-like array, potentially as a way to protect DNA associated with stalled replication.

Mono-ubiquitination is also required for interaction with the nuclease FAN1. FAN1 recruitment and its consequent activity restrain DNA replication fork progression and prevent chromosome abnormalities from occurring when DNA replication forks stall.

Infertility

Humans with a FANCD deficiency display hypogonadism, male infertility, impaired spermatogenesis, and reduced female fertility.  Similarly, mice deficient in FANCD2 show hypogonadism, impaired fertility and impaired gametogenesis.

In the non-mutant mouse, FANCD2 is expressed in spermatogonia, pre-leptotene spermatocytes, and in spermatocytes in the leptotene, zygotene and early pachytene stages of meiosis.  In synaptonemal complexes of meiotic chromosomes, activated FANCD2 protein co-localizes with BRCA1 (breast cancer susceptibility protein).  FANCD2 mutant mice exhibit chromosome mis-pairing during the pachytene stage of meiosis and germ cell loss.  Activated FANCD2 protein may normally function prior to the initiation of meiotic recombination, perhaps to prepare chromosomes for synapsis, or to regulate subsequent recombination events.

Clinical significance 

Tobacco smoke suppresses the expression of FANCD2, which codes for a DNA damage "caretaker" or repair mechanism.

Cancer

FANCD2 mutant mice have a significantly increased incidence of tumors including ovarian, gastric and hepatic adenomas as well as hepatocellular, lung, ovarian and mammary carcinomas.  Humans with a FANCD2 deficiency have increased acute myeloid leukemia, and squamous cell carcinomas (head and neck squamous cell carcinomas and anogenital carcinomas). Lung squamous tumors express high levels of FANCD2 and members of Fanconia anemia pathway.

FANCD2 monoubiquitination is also a potential therapeutic target in the treatment of cancer.

Interactions 

FANCD2 has been shown to interact with:
 FANCI
 Ataxia telangiectasia mutated,
 BARD1,
 BRCA1.
 BRCA2,
 FANCE,
 HTATIP, and
 MEN1.

References

External links

Human proteins

Further reading